The 2007 Kazakhstan Hockey Cup was the 6th edition of the Kazakhstan Hockey Cup, the national ice hockey cup competition in Kazakhstan. Seven teams participated and Kazzinc-Torpedo won its 4th Cup.

First round
Group A

Group B

Final round

References

2007–08 in Kazakhstani ice hockey
Kazakhstan Hockey Cup